Psara admensalis is a moth in the family Crambidae. It was described by Francis Walker in 1859. It is found in Sri Lanka, South Africa and on Réunion.

The larvae feed on Acanthus ebracteatus.

References

Spilomelinae
Moths described in 1859